Saale-Unstrut is a region (Anbaugebiet) for quality wine in Germany, and takes its name from the rivers Saale and Unstrut. The region is located on various hill slopes around these rivers.

Geography and climate 

Saale-Unstrut is the northernmost of Germany's wine regions, and is therefore one of Europe's northernmost traditional wine regions. The wines from the Memleben Abbey were mentioned in the literature already in the year 998 AD. Because of the cooler climate Spätlese or Auslese can be produced only in exceptionally warm years and yields are generally low.

The region in the district Burgenlandkreis has a wine route which was opened in 1993.

Grape varieties 

White grape varieties make up 74% of Saale-Unstrut's plantations. Varieties such as Müller-Thurgau and Silvaner, which elsewhere are considered to produce wines of more mediocre quality, are sometimes considered to give better wines in the cold climate such as Saale-Unstrut's. The wines are labelled varietally, as most German wines, and are generally vinified dry with a refreshing acidity, resulting from the cool growing conditions.

The most cultivated grape varieties, by area in 2008, were:

References

External links 

Wine regions of Germany
Regions of Thuringia
Burgenlandkreis
Regions of Saxony-Anhalt